Boles is an unincorporated community and census-designated place (CDP) in Scott County, Arkansas, United States. It was first listed as a CDP in the 2020 census with a population of 166.

Boles has a post office with ZIP code 72926.

Demographics

2020 census

Note: the US Census treats Hispanic/Latino as an ethnic category. This table excludes Latinos from the racial categories and assigns them to a separate category. Hispanics/Latinos can be of any race.

History
A post office called Boles was established in 1870. The community was named after the local Boles family of settlers.

References

Unincorporated communities in Scott County, Arkansas
Unincorporated communities in Arkansas